Ovalis, oval in Latin, may refer to:
 Fossa ovalis (disambiguation)
 Limbus of fossa ovalis, the prominent oval margin of the fossa ovalis